Freakatorium is the fifth album by drummer Keith LeBlanc, released on March 9, 1999 by Blanc Records.

Track listing

Personnel 

Musicians
Keith LeBlanc – drums, drum programming, percussion, keyboards, vocals, producer, mixing (2, 3, 6, 8-10, 12)
Skip McDonald – guitar, bass guitar, keyboards, harp, mixing (8)
Michael Mondesir – bass guitar (4)
Doug Wimbish – bass guitar (2, 3, 5, 9, 12, 13)

Technical personnel
Darren Grant – mixing (6, 8)
Adrian Sherwood – mixing (1, 3-5, 7, 9, 11-13), remix (13)

Release history

References 

1999 albums
Keith LeBlanc albums
Albums produced by Keith LeBlanc